Saint Elias, the Latin form of the Hebrew name Elijah, may refer to any of:

People
 Elijah, an Old Testament prophet sometimes revered as a Christian saint
 Elias I of Jerusalem (died 516), 5th-century Patriarch of Jerusalem
 Elias and companions (died 309), group of Egyptian Christian martyrs (d.309)
 Ignatius Elias III, a Syriac Orthodox Patriarch of Antioch who is a saint in the Syriac Orthodox Church

Places
 Mount Saint Elias, the second highest mountain in Canada and the United States
 Saint Elias Mountains, a mountain range in Alaska and the Canadian Yukon
 Mount Carmel in Haifa, also known as Mount Saint Elias (Jebel Mar Elyas)
 Saint Elias Monastery (Shwayya, Lebanon)

See also
Elias (disambiguation)
Agios Ilias (disambiguation), Saint Elias in Greek
Mar Elias (disambiguation), Saint Elias in Aramaic and Arabic